The Woodward Stakes is an American Grade I stakes race and is one of the premier races for older thoroughbred horses in the United States. It is named for prominent racehorse owner William Woodward.

The race was first run in 1954 at Aqueduct Racetrack and then at Belmont Park in late September. In 2006, the Woodward was moved to Saratoga Race Course where it was run on the final Saturday of the meet until 2020. The race was moved back to Belmont Park in 2021.

The Woodward was run as a handicap in 1954, 1955, and in 1976 and 1977. From 1957 through 1975 it was a weight-for-age event, and was run as an allowance stakes from 1977 through 1987. The race returned to being a handicap event in 1988, 1989, and 1990 then reverted to a weight-for-age race in 1991. In 2014, it was changed to allowance weights, meaning horses that do not meet certain conditions carry less weight. In 2020, it was returned to a handicap basis.

History
This race is to honor the memory of Belair Stud's William Woodward Sr., a dedicated horseman, who was chairman of the Jockey Club from 1930 to 1950.

Since its inception, the Woodward Stakes has been run at a variety of distances:
 1 mile – 1954
  miles – 1955, 1976–1977, 1981–1987, 1990–2019, 2021-present
  miles – 1956–1971, 1978–1980, 1988–1989, 2020
  miles – 1972–1975

Notable Moments
The Woodward has long been one of America's most prestigious stakes races on the East Coast, along with the Jockey Club Gold Cup. Both races currently serve as major preps for the Breeders' Cup Classic. The Woodward has been won by many horses who were subsequently named the American Horse of the Year and twenty winners of the race were eventually inducted into the Hall of Fame: Sword Dancer, Kelso, Gun Bow, Buckpasser, Damascus, Arts and Letters, Forego, Seattle Slew, Affirmed, Spectacular Bid, Slew o’ Gold, Precisionist, Alysheba, Easy Goer, Holy Bull, Cigar, Skip Away, Ghostzapper, Curlin and Rachel Alexandra.

Kelso, the only five-time Horse of the Year in American history, won three consecutive renewals of the race between 1961 and 1963. In the 1964 renewal, he faced the talented Gun Bow, who had already beaten Kelso once that year. The two battled the entire length of the stretch and were separated at the wire by less than an inch: Gun Bow won by the bob of his head.

In 1973, Secretariat lost the Woodward to Prove Out, who set a stakes record for the then-current distance of  miles. The next year, Forego began a four-year win streak. Triple Crown winners Seattle Slew and Affirmed also won the race during the 1970s.

In 2009 at age three, Rachel Alexandra became the first female to win the Woodward. It was also her first race against older males. Only one other 3-year-old filly had ever run in the Woodward: Summer Guest in 1972. She finished second to Key to the Mint before being disqualified and placed third. In 2011 Havre De Grace, a 4 year old filly, became the 2nd female to win the Woodward.

Records
Speed record:
 1:45.80 for  miles – Forego (1976) and Dispersal (1990)
 1:59.40 for  miles – Alysheba (1988)
 2:25.80 for  miles – Prove Out (1973)

Most wins:
 4 – Forego (1974, 1975, 1976, 1977)

Most wins by an owner:
 4 – Lazy F Ranch (1974, 1975, 1976, 1977)

Most wins by a jockey:
 6 – Ángel Cordero Jr. (1978, 1981, 1982, 1983, 1984, 1985)
 6 – Jerry D. Bailey (1992, 1995, 1996, 1998, 2001, 2005) 

Most wins by a trainer:
 5 – William I. Mott (1995, 1996, 2012, 2018, 2021)

Wins by a filly or mare:
 Rachel Alexandra (2009)
 Havre de Grace (2011)

Winners of the Woodward Stakes 

 A ‡ designates that this is a filly or mare that won the race.
 † Cougar II finished first, but was disqualified and placed third.

See also 
 Woodward Stakes top three finishers and starters

References

External links
Woodward Stakes Race Page, NTRA

Graded stakes races in the United States
1954 establishments in New York City
Open mile category horse races
Horse races in New York (state)
Grade 1 stakes races in the United States
Recurring sporting events established in 1954
Belmont Park
Saratoga Race Course